Gary J. Richardson (July 24, 1935 – December 19, 2002) was an American football coach and former player.  He served as the head football coach at  Colorado State University–Pueblo (CSU–Pueblo) for one season in 1984 before the program was closed due to budget cuts. 

Richardson was the head coach at Chadron State College in Chadron, Nebraska from 1982 to 1983. He was a coach for Colorado Mines, and was an assistant coach at Stonehill College from 1999 to 2002.

He died from cancer at his home in Colorado on December 19, 2002 at age 67.

Head coaching record

References

Chadron State Eagles football coaches
CSU Pueblo ThunderWolves football coaches
Colorado College alumni
1935 births
2002 deaths